Majok Machar Deng (born 1 March 1993) is a South Sudanese-Australian professional basketball player for the Cairns Taipans of the National Basketball League (NBL). After winning back-to-back Central ABL Championships with the Forestville Eagles in 2011 and 2012, Deng moved to the United States to attend college, where he first played for Indian Hills Community College. In 2014, he transferred to Louisiana–Monroe, where he played two seasons of Division I college basketball for the Warhawks and led the Sun Belt Conference in scoring and blocks as a senior. In 2016, Deng returned home and joined the Adelaide 36ers.

Early life and career
Deng was born in Bor, Sudan on 1 March 1993, and spent the first seven to eight years of his life in the country. He moved to Australia in 2006 after spending a number of years living in a Kenyan refugee camp. Deng settled down in Adelaide with his mother and sister.

Deng originally dreamed of playing professional soccer, but a significant growth spurt of 11 cm in 12 months changed his life, switching him from soccer to basketball. Deng took up basketball in 2009, and by 2010, he was playing division three under 18s basketball for Forestville. He credits his rapid development and quick rise to his under 18s coach, Scott Freer, who gave him specialist training over a two-year period. In December 2010, Deng had a try-out with the Forestville Eagles' Central ABL team and was successful in gaining a roster spot for the 2011 season. His Eagles teammate, former NBL player Rashad Tucker, took on a mentoring role for Deng during his rookie year. Tucker assisted in the development of Sudanese-born players. In September 2011, Deng helped the Eagles win the Central ABL Grand Final. The Eagles trailed Norwood by eight points with 87 seconds left in the third quarter, before Tucker and Deng inspired their team to 29 of the game's last 36 points. Deng entered the game with 1.34 remaining in the third, and immediately produced the sort of energy that had been lacking from his teammates for most of the night. Deng ended the night with two points, six rebounds, one steal and one block, but his most significant stat was his team's 20-point advantage with him on the floor. The Eagles won the match 82–68. In 18 games for the Eagles in 2011, he averaged 4.2 points and 2.7 rebounds per game.

Deng returned to the Forestville Eagles for the 2012 Central ABL season, where in 16 games, he averaged 10.3 points and 5.9 rebounds per game. His final game for the Eagles came on 18 August 2012 in the Eagles' semi-final loss to the Sturt Sabres; he scored 13 points in the match. The Eagles went on to win the preliminary final without Deng, which advanced them to the grand final. In the grand final, they faced the Sturt Sabres, but this time got the better of the Sabres as they completed back-to-back titles with a come-from-behind 86–78 overtime victory.

College career

Indian Hills (2012–2014)
Recruited to play college basketball in the United States after impressing with 23 points for South Australia in its losing Australian Under-20 Championship Grand Final, Deng was earmarked for greatness by his coach at Forestville Eagles, Andy Simons. Deng enrolled at Indian Hills Community College and joined the Warriors men's basketball program. As a freshman in 2012–13, Deng played in 27 games and was one of the first players used off the bench by coach Barret Peery. He averaged 3.8 points and 2.9 rebounds per game. Deng's highlight moment of the season came when he drilled three three-pointers in overtime to help Indian Hills topple Southeastern 104–99.

On 7 November 2013, Deng was named the recipient of the Arnold Black Memorial Scholarship. It is awarded to a sophomore member of the Warriors who best exemplifies the strong competitive spirit shown by Black and exhibits his love for the game of basketball. As a sophomore in 2013–14, Deng averaged 5.0 points and 4.1 rebounds per game. In his sophomore campaign, Deng's top offensive performance came when he scored 16 points in a 132–84 victory over John Wood Community College. He guided the program to a 34–3 record in 2013–14 and a combined 60–7 record in his two years. He also led Indian Hills to the 2014 Regional and District Championships.

Louisiana–Monroe (2014–2016)
On 22 April 2014, Deng signed a National Letter of Intent to play Division I college basketball for Louisiana–Monroe.

As a junior at Louisiana–Monroe in 2014–15, Deng played in all 38 games and made 37 starts. He recorded eight double-doubles, 25 double-figure scoring games and a pair of 20-plus scoring outings. He averaged 10.7 points and a team-high 7.3 rebounds per game on the year. He also led the team in blocked shots with 1.3 per game, ranking third in the league. He subsequently earned third-team All-Sun Belt Conference, All-Louisiana first team, and College Sports Madness All-SBC second team honours. In the CBI Tournament semi-final on 25 March 2015, Deng scored a season-high 22 points in a 71–65 win over Vermont. The Warhawks went on to lose the CBI Championship Series with a 2–0 defeat to Loyola.

As a senior in 2015–16, Deng was the Sun Belt Conference scoring champion, averaging 19.0 points per game in league play. He also finished first in the conference in blocks (1.9 bpg), third in minutes (37.5 mpg) and offensive rebounds (5.3 orpg), fifth in three-point field goal percentage (.421), sixth in three-pointers per game (2.3 3pg), seventh in rebounding (6.9 rpg) and eighth in free throw percentage (.793). He netted a trio of 30-plus scoring performances and 11 20-plus games. He won seven weekly awards including CollegeInsider.com National Mid-Major Player of the Week (7 December), Louisiana Player of the Week (21 December), College Sports Madness Player of the Week (25 January), SBC Student-Athlete of the Week (15 February), Louisiana Player of the Week (15 February), CSM Player of the Week (15 February) and SBC Student-Athlete of the Week (7 March). Overall, Deng averaged 18.4 points, 7.0 rebounds, 1.9 assists and 1.6 blocks in 31 games (all starts). On 21 January 2016, he tied his career high of 33 points against Troy, having previously scored 33 points a month earlier against Central Baptist. At the season's end, he earned first-team All-Sun Belt Conference, Sun Belt All-Tournament Team, NABC All-District 24 first team, and All-Louisiana first team.

College statistics

|-
| style="text-align:left;"| 2014–15
| style="text-align:left;"| Louisiana–Monroe
| 38 || 37 || 30.7 || .442 || .345 || .765 || 7.3 || 1.1 || .6 || 1.3 || 10.7
|-
| style="text-align:left;"| 2015–16
| style="text-align:left;"| Louisiana–Monroe
| 31 || 31 || 36.3 || .479 || .376 || .813 || 7.0 || 1.9 || .7 || 1.6 || 18.4
|-
| style="text-align:center;" colspan="2"|Career
| 69 || 68 || 33.2 || .462 || .362 || .794 || 7.2 || 1.5 || .6 || 1.5 || 14.2
|-

Professional career
On 17 May 2016, Deng signed a three-year deal with the Adelaide 36ers of the National Basketball League (NBL). Later that month, he received an invite to work out with the Minnesota Timberwolves, and later played one game for the Timberwolves' Summer League team in Las Vegas.

On 7 October 2016, Deng made his NBL debut in the 36ers' season opener against the Illawarra Hawks. In 16½ minutes off the bench, he recorded 13 points and six rebounds in a 122–88 loss. Deng failed to surpass that mark throughout the season, as he scored in double figures just three more times. In 27 games for the 36ers in 2016–17, Deng averaged 4.7 points and 2.2 rebounds in 9.2 minutes per game.

Following his rookie season in the NBL, Deng re-joined the Forestville Eagles of the South Australian Premier League for the 2017 season. In 17 games for the Eagles, he averaged 26.9 points, 12.1 rebounds and 2.3 assists per game.

On 4 January 2018, Deng scored a career-high 16 points, including 11 points in the opening three minutes of the final period, to help the 36ers defeat the Perth Wildcats 97–86. On 17 February 2018, he set a new career high with 20 points, including 13-of-14 free throws, in a 105–82 win over the Brisbane Bullets. Deng helped the 36ers reach the 2018 NBL Grand Final series, where they lost to Melbourne United in five games. In 35 games in 2017–18, he averaged 7.3 points and 2.4 rebounds per game.

On 19 January 2018, Deng signed with the Mount Gambier Pioneers for the 2018 SEABL season. He appeared in one game for the Pioneers before suffering a severe ankle injury that derailed his season. On 23 May 2018, he was released by the Pioneers in order for him to prepare for NBA camps in June. However, the ankle injury resulted in his NBA dream delayed at least another 12 months, and instead he re-joined the Forestville Eagles, where he had a three-game stint.

With the 36ers in 2018–19, Deng 7.6 points and 2.9 rebounds per game. Following his season with the 36ers, he re-joined the Forestville Eagles, helping them win the 2019 Premier League championship. In 19 games for the Eagles, he averaged 27.74 points, 11.63 rebounds and 2.89 assists per game.

On 5 April 2019, Deng signed a three-year deal with the Cairns Taipans. On 24 February 2021, he was ruled out for six weeks with a partial tear to his left MCL. In June 2021, he joined the Cairns Marlins of the NBL1 North. 

On 13 July 2021, Deng re-signed with the Taipans on a new three-year deal. Following the 2021–22 NBL season, he joined the Ipswich Force for the 2022 NBL1 North season.

National team career
In 2022, Deng was selected to play for the South Sudanese national team in the FIBA World Cup Qualifiers.

Personal life
Deng officially became an Australian citizen in May 2021.

References

External links

NBL profile
Adelaide 36ers profile
Louisiana–Monroe Warhawks bio
washingtonpost.com profile

1993 births
Living people
Adelaide 36ers players
Australian expatriate basketball people in the United States
Australian men's basketball players
Basketball players from Adelaide
Cairns Taipans players
Indian Hills Warriors basketball players
Louisiana–Monroe Warhawks men's basketball players
Power forwards (basketball)
South Sudanese emigrants to Australia
South Sudanese expatriate basketball people in the United States
South Sudanese men's basketball players
People from Jonglei State
South Sudanese refugees
Refugees in Kenya
Sportsmen from South Australia